Tobacco package warning messages are warning messages that appear on the packaging of cigarettes and other tobacco products concerning their health effects. They have been implemented in an effort to enhance the public's awareness of the harmful effects of smoking. In general, warnings used in different countries try to emphasize the same messages. Warnings for some countries are listed below. Such warnings have been required in tobacco advertising for many years, with the earliest mandatory warning labels implemented in the United States in 1966. Implementing tobacco warning labels has been strongly opposed by the tobacco industry, most notably in Australia, following the implementation of plain packaging laws.

The WHO Framework Convention on Tobacco Control, adopted in 2003, requires such warning messages to promote awareness against smoking.

A 2009 review summarises that there is "clear evidence that tobacco package health warnings increase consumers' knowledge about the health consequences of tobacco use". The warning messages "contribute to changing consumers' attitudes towards tobacco use as well as changing consumers' behaviour".

At the same time, such warning labels have been subject to criticism. 2007 meta-analyses indicated that communications emphasizing the severity of a threat are less effective than communications focusing on susceptibility and that warning labels may have no effect among smokers who are not confident that they can quit, which lead the authors to recommend exploring different, potentially more effective methods of behaviour change.

In many countries, a variety of warnings with graphic, disturbing images of tobacco-related harms (including hematuria and diabetes) are placed prominently on cigarette packages.

Albania 
Text-based warnings on cigarette packets are used in Albania.

Pirja e duhanit mund të vrasë
 Smoking can kill
Pirja e duhanit ju dëmton ju dhe të tjerët rreth jush
 Smoking harms you and others around you
Duhanpirësit vdesin më të rinj
 Smokers die younger
Duhanpirja bllokon arteriet dhe shkakton infarkt të zemrës ose hemorragji cerebrale
 Smoking blocks the arteries and causes heart attacks or cerebral hemorrhage
Duhanpirja shkakton kancer në mushkëri
 Smoking causes lung cancer
Duhanpirja gjatë shtatëzanisë dëmton fëmijën tuaj
 Smoking during pregnancy harms your baby
Ruani fëmijët: mos i lini ata të thithin tymin tuaj
 Protect children, do not let them inhale your smoke
Mjeku ose farmacisti juaj mund t'ju ndihmojë të lini duhanin
 Your doctor or pharmacist can help you stop smoking
Duhanpirja shkakton varësi të fortë, mos e filloni atë
 Smoking causes a strong addiction, do not start
Lënia e duhanit pakëson rrezikun e sëmundjeve vdekjeprurëse të zemrës dhe mushkërive
 Leaving smoking reduces the risk of deadly heart and lung disease
Duhanpirja mund të shkaktojë një vdekje të ngadaltë dhe të dhimbshme
 Smoking can cause a slow and painful death
Kërkoni ndihmë për të lënë duhanin: telefon 0800 4747; Sektori i abuzimit me substancat, Instituti i Shëndetit Publik: www.ishp.gov.al; konsultonhuni me mjekun/farmacistin tuaj
 Ask for help to quit smoking: telephone 0800 4747; Substance Abuse sector, the Institute of Public Health: www.ishp.gov.al; consult your doctor/pharmacist
Duhanpirja mund të ngadalësojë rrjedhjen e gjakut dhe shkakton impotencë
 Smoking can slow blood flow and causes impotence
Duhanpirja shkakton plakjen e fytyrës
 Smoking causes facial aging
Duhani përmban benzen, nitrosaminë, formalinë dhe cianid hidrogjeni
 Smoking contains benzene, nitrosamines, formaldehyde and hydrogen cyanide
Pirja e duhanit shkakton sëmundje të zemrës
 Smoking causes heart disease
Duhanpirja mund të dëmtojë spermën dhe ul pjellorinë
 Smoking can damage sperm and decrease fertility
Duhani dëmton rëndë shëndetin
 Smoking seriously harms health

Argentina 
General warning: 

As of 30 January 2013, all cigarette packages must include graphical warning labels that show the detrimental effects on the health of long-term smokers.

Australia 

On 1 December 2012, Australia introduced ground-breaking legislation and the world's toughest tobacco packaging warning messages to date. All marketing and brand devices were removed from the package and replaced with warnings, only the name of the product remain in generic standard sized text. All tobacco products sold, offered for sale or otherwise supplied in Australia were plain-packaged and labelled with new and expanded health warnings.

Azerbaijan 
In Azerbaijan, cigarette packages carry a small notice: "Ministry of Health warns: Smoking is dangerous for your health", with no mandate on a minimum required size of the warning and a typical warning occupying around 6% of each side of the packaging. A specific health warning, as in a detailed description of the health effects of smoking and variety in the warnings used are not required by Azerbaijani law alongside no mandate for imagery.

Bangladesh 
50% of pictorial health warnings are implemented on the packets of all tobacco products in Bangladesh from 19 March 2016.

Bolivia 
In Bolivia, a variety of warnings with graphic, disturbing images of tobacco-related harms (including laryngeal cancer and heart attack) are placed prominently on cigarette packages.

Bosnia and Herzegovina 
Front of packaging (covers 30% of surface):
 Pušenje je štetno za zdravlje (Smoking is harmful to health)
 Pušenje ubija (Smoking kills)
 Pušenje ozbiljno šteti vama i drugima oko vas (Smoking seriously harms you and others around you)

Back of packaging (covers 50% of surface):
 Pušenje uzrokuje rak pluća (Smoking causes lung cancer)
 Pušenje uzrokuje srčani udar (Smoking causes heart attacks)
 Pušenje uzrokuje moždani udar (Smoking causes strokes)
 Pušenje u trudnoći šteti zdravlju Vašeg djeteta (Smoking while pregnant harms your child)

Before 2011, a small warning with the text Pušenje je štetno za zdravlje (Smoking is harmful to health) was printed on the back of cigarette packets.

Brazil 

Brazil was the second country in the world and the first country in Latin America to adopt mandatory warning images in cigarette packages. Warnings and graphic images illustrating the risks of smoking occupy 100% of the back of cigarettes boxes since 2001. In 2008, the government enacted a third batch of images aimed at younger smokers.

Since 2003, the sentence
 is displayed in all packs.

Brunei 

The following warnings appear on Bruneian cigarette packages:
 (Smoking causes various cancers)
 (Smoking causes strokes and heart diseases)
 (Smoking kills)

Cambodia 
In Cambodia, a variety of warnings with graphic, disturbing images of tobacco-related harms (including premature birth and lung cancer) are placed prominently on cigarette packages.

Canada 

Canada has had three phases of tobacco warning labels. The first set of warnings was introduced in 1989 under the Tobacco Products Control Act, and required warnings to be printed on all tobacco products sold legally in Canada. The set consisted of four messages printed in black-and-white on the front and back of the package, and was expanded in 1994 to include eight messages covering 25% of the front top of the package. In 2000, the Tobacco Products Information Regulations (TPIR) were passed under the Tobacco Act. The regulations introduced a new set of sixteen warnings. Each warning was printed on the front and back of the package, covering 50% of the surface, with a short explanation and a picture illustrating that particular warning, for example:

accompanied by a picture of a human lung detailing cancerous growths.

Additionally, on the inside of the packaging or, for some packets, on a pull-out card, "health information messages" provide answers and explanations regarding common questions and concerns about quitting smoking and smoking-related illnesses. The side of the package also featured information on toxic emissions and constituent levels.

In 2011, the TPIR were replaced for cigarettes and little cigars with the Tobacco Products Labelling Regulations (Cigarettes and Little Cigars). These regulations introduced the third and current set of 16 warnings in Canada. Currently, cigarette and little cigar packages in Canada must bear new graphic warning messages that cover 75% of the front and back of the package. The interior of each package contains 1 of 8 updated health warning messages, all including the number for a national quitline. The side of the package now bears 1 of 4 simplified toxic emission statements. These labels were fully implemented on cigarette and little cigar packages by June 2012 (though the 2000 labels still appear on other tobacco products). Canada also prohibits terms such as "light" and "mild" from appearing on tobacco packaging. The current labels were based on extensive research and a long consultation process that sought to evaluate and improve upon the warnings introduced in 2000.

In accordance with Canadian law regarding products sold legally in Canada, the warnings are provided in both English and French. Imported cigarettes to be sold in Canada which do not have the warnings are affixed with sticker versions when they are sold legally in Canada.

Health Canada considered laws mandating plain packaging, legal tobacco product packaging did still include warning labels, but brand names, fonts, and colors were replaced with simple unadorned text, thereby reducing the impact of tobacco industry marketing techniques.

There have been complaints from some Canadians due to the graphic nature of the labels. It was mandated in January 2020.

Chile 
Starting in November 2006, all cigarette packages sold in Chile are required to have one of two health warnings, a graphic pictorial warning or a text-only warning. These warnings are replaced with a new set of two warnings each year.

China 
Under laws of the People's Republic of China, the Law on Tobacco Monopoly (中华人民共和国烟草专卖法) Chapter 4, Article 18 and Regulations for the Implementation of the Law on Tobacco Monopoly (中华人民共和国烟草专卖法实施条例) Chapter 5 Article 29, cigarettes and cigars sold within Mainland China should indicate the grade of tar content and "Smoking is hazardous to your health" (吸烟有害健康) in the Chinese language on the packs and cartons.

In 2009, the warnings were changed. The warnings, which occupy not less than 30% of the front and back of cigarette packs, show "吸烟有害健康 尽早戒烟有益健康" (Smoking is harmful to your health. Quitting smoking early is good for your health) in the front and "吸烟有害健康 戒烟可减少对健康的危害" (Smoking is harmful to your health. Quitting smoking can reduce health risks) in the back.

The warnings were revised in October 2016 and must occupy at least 35% of the front and back of cigarette packs. The following are the current warnings.
 In the front:
 "本公司提示吸烟有害健康请勿在禁烟场所吸烟"
("Our company notes that smoking is harmful to your health. Do not smoke in non-smoking areas" in Chinese)
 In the back:
 尽早戒烟有益健康戒烟可减少对健康的危害"
("Quitting smoking as soon as possible is good for your health. It can also reduce health risks" in Chinese)
 or
 劝阻青少年吸烟禁止中小学生吸烟
("Dissuade teenagers from smoking. Prohibit primary and middle school students from smoking" in Chinese)

Colombia 
In Colombia, a variety of warnings with graphic, disturbing images of tobacco-related harms (including clogged arteries and bladder cancer) are placed prominently on cigarette packages.

Costa Rica 
In Costa Rica, a variety of warnings with graphic, disturbing images of tobacco-related harms (including lung cancer and heart attack) are placed prominently on cigarette packages.

East Timor 
Before 2018, the most prominent warning on East Timorese cigarette packages was:

Starting from 2018, a variety of warnings with images of tobacco-related harms are placed prominently on cigarette packages. Graphic warning messages must consist of 85% of the front of cigarette packages and 100% of the back. After the introduction of graphic images in East Timorese cigarette packaging, the branding of cigarettes as "light", "mild", etc. is forbidden.

 FUMA OHO ITA (Smoking kills)
 FUMA KAUZA IMPOTÉNSIA (Smoking can cause impotence)
 FUMA PROVOKA MOAS FUAN (Smoking can cause heart attacks)
 FUMA KAUZA ABORTU (Smoking can cause abortions)
 FUMA PROVOKA KANKRU (Smoking can cause cancer)
 FUMA KAUZA PULMAUN KRONIKU (Smoking can cause chronic lung disease)
 Konsulta atu para fuma – Numero telf: 113 (Consultation for quitting smoking – Phone number: 113)

Ecuador 
In Ecuador, a variety of warnings with graphic, disturbing images of tobacco-related harms (including tongue cancer and premature birth) are placed prominently on cigarette packages.

Egypt 
In Egypt, a variety of warnings with graphic, disturbing images of tobacco-related harms (including mouth cancer and gangrene) are placed prominently on cigarette packages.

European Union 
Cigarette packets and other tobacco packaging must include warnings in the same size and format and using the same approved texts (in the appropriate local languages) in all member states of the European Union.

These warnings are displayed in black Helvetica bold on a white background with a thick black border. Ireland once prefaced its warnings with "Irish Government Warning", Latvia with "Veselības ministrija brīdina" (Health Ministry Warning) and Spain with "Las Autoridades Sanitarias Advierten" ("The Health Board Warns"). In member states with more than one official language, the warnings are displayed in all official languages, with the sizes adjusted accordingly (for example in Belgium the messages are written in Dutch, French and German, in Luxembourg in French and German and in Ireland, in Irish and English). All cigarette packets sold in the European Union must display the content of nicotine, tar, and carbon monoxide in the same manner on the side of the packet.

In 2003, it was reported that sales of cigarette cases had surged, attributable to the introduction of more prominent warning labels on cigarette packs by an EU directive in January 2003. Alternatively, people choose to hide the warnings using various "funny" stickers, such as "You could be hit by a bus tomorrow."

The most recent EU legislation is the Tobacco Products Directive, which became applicable in EU countries in May 2016.

front, takes up 30%

reverse, takes up 40%

Austria and Germany 

General warnings

 Rauchen fügt Ihnen und den Menschen in Ihrer Umgebung erheblichen Schaden zu. – Smoking severely harms you and the people around you.
Additional warnings
 Raucher sterben früher – Smokers die sooner.
 Rauchen führt zur Verstopfung der Arterien und verursacht Herzinfarkte und Schlaganfälle. – Smoking leads to clogging of arteries and causes heart attacks and strokes.
 Rauchen verursacht tödlichen Lungenkrebs. – Smoking causes deadly lung cancer.
 Rauchen in der Schwangerschaft schadet Ihrem Kind – Smoking while pregnant harms your child.
 Schützen Sie Kinder – lassen Sie sie nicht Ihren Tabakrauch einatmen! – Protect children – don't let them inhale your tobacco smoke!
 Ihr Arzt oder Apotheker kann Ihnen dabei helfen, das Rauchen aufzugeben. – Your doctor or pharmacist can help you to give up smoking.
 Rauchen macht sehr schnell abhängig: Fangen Sie gar nicht erst an! – Smoking makes you addicted very fast: Don't start in the first place!
 Wer das Rauchen aufgibt, verringert das Risiko tödlicher Herz- und Lungenerkrankungen – Giving up smoking reduces the risk of fatal heart and lung diseases.
 Rauchen kann zu einem langsamen und schmerzhaften Tod führen – Smoking can lead to a slow and painful death.
 Rauchen kann zu Durchblutungsstörungen führen und verursacht Impotenz – Smoking can lead to blood circulation disorders and causes impotence.
 Rauchen lässt Ihre Haut altern – Smoking ages your skin.
 Rauchen kann die Spermatozoen schädigen und schränkt die Fruchtbarkeit ein – Smoking can damage the spermatozoa and decreases your fertility.
 Rauch enthält Benzol, Nitrosamine, Formaldehyd und Blausäure – Smoke contains benzene, nitrosamine, formaldehyde and hydrogen cyanide.

Belgium 
In Belgium, warning signs are written in Dutch, French and German, the three official languages of Belgium.

Croatia 
Front of packaging (covers 30% of surface):

or

Back of packaging (covers 40% of surface):
 Pušači umiru mlađi (Smokers die younger)
 Pušenje uzrokuje začepljenje arterija i uzrokuje srčani i moždani udar (Smoking clogs your arteries and causes heart attacks and strokes)
 Pušenje uzrokuje smrtonosan rak pluća (Smoking causes lethal lung cancer)
 Pušenje u trudnoći šteti vašem djetetu (Smoking while pregnant harms your child)
 Zaštitite djecu od udisanja vašeg cigaretnog dima (Protect children from inhaling your cigarette smoke)
 Vaš liječnik ili ljekarnik može vam pomoći prestati pušiti (Your doctor or pharmacist can help you stop smoking)
 Pušenje stvara izrazitu ovisnost, nemojte ni počinjati (Smoking is highly addictive, don't even start)
 Prestanak pušenja umanjuje rizik smrtnih srčanih ili plućnih bolesti (Quitting smoking reduces the risk of deadly heart and lung diseases)
 Pušenje može izazvati polaganu i bolnu smrt (Smoking can cause a slow and painful death)
 Potražite pomoć za prestanak pušenja /savjetujte se sa svojim liječnikom/ljekarnikom) (Get help to stop smoking /consult with your doctor/pharmacist)
 Pušenje može usporiti krvotok i prouzročiti impotenciju (Smoking can slow down blood circulation and cause impotence)
 Pušenje uzrokuje starenje kože (Smoking causes aging of the skin)
 Pušenje može oštetiti spermu i smanjiti plodnost (Smoking can damage sperm and reduce fertility)
 Dim sadrži benzene, nitrozamine, formaldehide i ugljikove cijanide (Smoke contains benzene, nitrosamines, formaldehyde and hydrogen cyanides*)

The last warning contains a mistranslation from Directive 2001/37/EC – "hydrogen" was translated as ugljik (carbon) instead of vodik. It was nevertheless signed into law and started appearing on cigarette packages in March 2009.

2004–2009
These warnings are also simple text warnings.

Front of packaging:
 Pušenje šteti Vašem zdravlju (Smoking harms your health)

Back of packaging:
 Pušenje uzrokuje rak (Smoking causes cancer)
 Pušenje u trudnoći šteti i razvoju djeteta (Smoking while pregnant harms the child's development)
 Pušenje uzrokuje srčani i moždani udar (Smoking causes heart attacks and strokes)
 Pušenje skraćuje život (Smoking shortens your life)

Side of packaging:
 Zabranjuje se prodaja osobama mlađim od 18 godina (Not for sale to persons under the age of 18)

1997–2004
Between 1997 and 2004, a simple text label warning Pušenje je štetno za zdravlje (Smoking is harmful to health) was used.

Cyprus 
Front side

or

Rear 
   (Smokers die younger.)
   (Smoking clogs the arteries and causes heart attacks and strokes.)
   (Smoking causes terminal lung cancer.)
   (Smoking during pregnancy may harm your baby.)
   (Protect children: don't make them breathe your smoke.)
   (Your doctor or your pharmacist can help you stop smoking.)
   (Smoking is highly addictive, don't start.)
   (Stopping smoking reduces the risk of fatal heart and lung diseases.)
   (Smoking can cause a slow and painful death.)
   (Smoking may reduce the blood flow and cause impotence.)
   (Smoking causes ageing of the skin.)
   (Smoking can damage the sperm and decreases fertility.)
   (Smoke contains benzene, nitrosamines, formaldehyde and hydrogen cyanide.)

Czech Republic 

Kouření vážně škodí Vám i lidem ve Vašem okolí. (Smoking seriously harms you and others around you.)
Kuřáci umírají předčasně. (Smokers die younger.)
Kouření ucpává tepny a způsobuje infarkt a mrtvici. (Smoking clogs the blood vessels and causes heart attacks and strokes.)
Kouření způsobuje smrtelnou rakovinu plic. (Smoking causes deadly lung cancer.)
Kouření je vysoce návykové, nezačínejte s ním. (Smoking is highly addictive, don't start.)
Přestat kouřit, znamená snížit riziko vzniku smrtelných onemocnění srdce a plic. (Quitting smoking reduces the risk of deadly heart and lung diseases.)
Kouření může způsobit pomalou a bolestivou smrt. (Smoking can cause a slow and painful death.)
Kouření způsobuje stárnutí kůže. (Smoking causes ageing of the skin.)
Kouření může poškodit sperma a snižuje plodnost.  (Smoking can damage sperm and reduce fertility.)
Kouření může snižovat krevní oběh a způsobuje neplodnost. (Smoking can reduce blood flow and cause impotence.)
Kouř obsahuje benzen, nitrosaminy, formaldehyd a kyanovodík. (Smoke contains benzene, nitrosamines, formaldehyde and hydrogen cyanides.)
Kouření v těhotenství škodí zdraví Vašeho dítěte. (Smoking while pregnant harms your child.)
Chraňte děti: nenuťte je vdechovat Váš kouř. (Protect children: don't make them breathe your smoke.)
Váš lékař nebo lékárník Vám může pomoci přestat s kouřením. (Your doctor or pharmacist can help you stop smoking.)
Získejte pomoc při odvykání kouření. (Seek help to stop smoking.)

As of 7 December 2016, all packages must also include warning images additionally to text warnings. Also cigarette manufacturers are prohibited to display the content of nicotine, tar and carbon monoxide on cigarette packages, because it might mislead customers. The box previously containing the contents of the cigarette was replaced by a warning message: Tabákový kouř obsahuje přes 70 látek, které prokazatelně způsobují rakovinu. (Tobacco smoke contains over 70 substances, which provably cause cancer.)

Denmark 
Warning texts in tobacco products, health warnings, which are reproduced on the packaging of cigarettes and other tobacco products. It is implemented in an effort to strengthen public knowledge about the dangers of smoking.

The order was introduced in Denmark on 31 December 1991. The Order was last revised on 2 October 2003, which also imposed ban on the words "light" and "mild" on Danish cigarette packages, as did European Union countries.

The marking shall appear on one third of the most visible part of the package.

  (Smoking seriously harms you and others around you)
  (Smokers die younger)
  (Smoking clogs the arteries and causes heart attacks and strokes)
  (Smoking causes fatal lung cancer)
  (If you are pregnant, smoking damages your child's health)
  (Protect children from tobacco smoke – they have the right to choose)
  (Your doctor or your pharmacist can help you stop smoking)
  (Smoking is highly addictive, do not start)
  (Stopping smoking reduces the risk of fatal heart and lung diseases)
  (Smoking can cause a slow and painful death)
  (Get help to quit smoking: Telephone number 80313131)
  (Smoking may reduce blood flow and causes impotence)
  (Smoking causes aging of the skin)
  (Smoking can damage sperm and reduce fertility)
  (Smoke contains benzene, nitrosamines, formaldehyde and hydrogen cyanide)

For smokeless tobacco use above markings does not, whereas the label "" (This tobacco product can damage your health and is addictive) is always used for such products.

Estonia 
General warning:

or

Finland 

In Finland, warning signs are written in both Finnish and Swedish languages.
 
 Tupakointi vahingoittaa vakavasti sinua ja ympärilläsi olevia / Rökning skadar allvarligt dig själv och personer i din omgivning (Smoking severely harms you and those around you)
 Tupakoivat kuolevat nuorempina / Rökare dör i förtid (Smokers die younger)
 Tupakointi tukkii verisuonet sekä aiheuttaa sydänkohtauksia ja aivoveritulppia / Rökning ger förträngningar i blodkärlen och orsakar hjärtinfarkt och stroke (Smoking clogs the arteries and causes heart attacks and strokes)
 Tupakointi aiheuttaa keuhkosyöpää, joka johtaa kuolemaan / Rökning orsakar dödlig lungcancer (Smoking causes lung cancer, which leads to death / Smoking causes fatal lung cancer)
 Tupakointi raskauden aikana vahingoittaa lastasi / Rökning under graviditeten skadar ditt barn (Smoking during pregnancy harms your child)
 Suojele lapsia ― älä pakota heitä hengittämään tupakansavua / Skydda barnen ― låt dem inte andas in din tobaksrök (Protect children ― don't force them to breathe tobacco smoke / Protect children ― don't make them breathe your smoke)
 Lääkäriltä tai apteekista saat apua tupakoinnin lopettamiseen / Din läkare eller ditt apotek kan hjälpa dig att sluta röka (You receive help to stop smoking from a doctor or a pharmacy / Your doctor or your pharmacist can help you stop smoking)
 Tupakointi aiheuttaa voimakasta riippuvuutta. Älä aloita / Rökning är mycket beroendeframkallande. Börja inte rök (Smoking causes powerful addiction. Don't start / Smoking is highly addictive. Don't start)
 Lopettamalla tupakoinnin vähennät vaaraa sairastua kuolemaan johtaviin sydän- ja keuhkosairauksiin / Om du slutar röka löper du mindre risk att få dödliga hjärt- och lungsjukdomar (By stopping smoking you reduce the risk of fatal heart and lung diseases / Stopping smoking reduces the risk of fatal heart and lung diseases)
 Tupakointi voi aiheuttaa hitaan ja tuskallisen kuoleman / Rökning kan leda till en långsam och smärtsam död (Smoking can cause a slow and painful death)
 Pyydä apua tupakoinnin lopettamiseen: puh. 0800 148 484 / Sök hjälp för att sluta röka: tfn 0800 148 484 (Request help to stop smoking: call 0800 148 484 / Get help to stop smoking: call 0800 148 484)
 Tupakointi aiheuttaa impotenssia ja voi heikentää verenkiertoa / Rökning kan försämra blodflödet och orsakar impotens (Smoking causes impotence and may reduce the blood flow / Smoking may reduce the blood flow and cause impotence)
 Tupakointi vanhentaa ihoa / Rökning får din hy att åldras (Smoking ages the skin / Smoking causes ageing of the skin)
 Tupakointi voi vahingoittaa siittiöitä ja vähentää hedelmällisyyttä / Rökning kan skada sperman och minskar fruktsamheten (Smoking can damage the sperm and decrease fertility / Smoking can damage the sperm and decreases fertility)
 Savu sisältää bentseeniä, nitrosamiineja, formaldehydiä ja vetysyanidia / Rök innehåller bensen, nitrosaminer, formaldehyd och cyanväte (Smoke contains benzene, nitrosamines, formaldehyde and hydrogen cyanide)

France 

Before January 2017, France used regular EU warnings for tobacco products.
Front of packaging (covers 30% of surface)

or

Rear (covers 40% of surface, similar design)
  (Smokers die prematurely.)
  (Smoking clogs arteries and causes heart attacks and strokes.)
  (Smoking causes fatal lung cancer.)
  (Smoking during pregnancy harms your child's health.)
  (Protect your children: don't make them breathe your smoke.)
  (Your doctor or pharmacist can help you quit smoking.)
  (Smoking is highly addictive, don't start.)
  (Quitting smoking reduces the risk of fatal heart and lung diseases.)
  (Smoking can result in a slow and painful death.)
  (Help yourself quit smoking: call 0 825 309 310)
  (Smoking can reduce the blood flow and causes impotence.)
  (Smoking damages sperm and reduces fertility.)
  (Cigarette smoke contains benzene, nitrosamines, formaldehyde and hydrogen cyanide.)
Left or right side of packaging
 Components percentages (15% of surface, small prints): Tobacco – Cigarette paper – Flavor and texture agents
 ISO yields of toxics in mg/cigarette (in prominent black on white square and bold letters): Tar – Nicotin – Carbon monoxide
Other side of packaging
 Country of manufacturing, name of manufacturer, quantity
 Product identifier (EAN-7 bar code)
Other characteristics
 Small print: "" (sales in France)
 Recyclable logo (for the packaging)
 Words forbidden in the displayed product name: light, ultra-light, légere, or any indication that may indicate that this is a minor drug with low impact (These branding words have been replaced by various colour names)
Plain packaging has been regulated since January 2017.

Greece 
 
  (Smoking can kill)
  (Smoking seriously harms the smoker and the ones around him.)
  (Smoking seriously harms you and the ones around you.)
  (Smokers die prematurely.)
  (Smoking clogs the arteries and causes heart attacks and strokes.)
  (Smoking causes fatal lung cancers.)
  (Smoking during pregnancy can harm the health of your baby.)
  (Protect children: do not force them to breathe in your smoke.)
  (Your physician or pharmacist can assist you in quitting smoking.)
  (Smoking is very addictive; don't start with it)
  (Stopping smoking reduces the risk of fatal heart and lung diseases)
  (Smoking can cause a slow and painful death.)
  (Seek help to quit smoking: consult your doctor.)
  (Smoking may reduce blood circulation and cause impotence)
  (Smoking causes premature skin aging.)
  (Smoking damages sperm and reduces fertility.)
  (Cigarette smoke contains benzene, nitrosamines, formaldehyde and hydrogen cyanide.)

Hungary 
 
  (Smokers die earlier.)
  (Smoking clogs arteries and causes heart diseases and strokes.)
  (Smoking causes fatal lung cancer.)
  (Smoking during pregnancy harms the baby.)
  (Protect the kids, don't smoke in their presence.)
  (Your doctor or your pharmacist may help you quit smoking.)
  (Smoking is highly addictive, don't start.)
  (Quitting smoking reduces the risk of deadly cardiovascular and lung diseases.)
  (Smoking can cause a long and painful death.)
  (Specialists in the medical profession may help you quit smoking.)
  (Smoking may reduce blood circulation and cause impotency.)
  (Smoking ages the skin.)
  (Smoking may damage sperm and diminish fertility.)
  (Cigarettes contain benzene, nistrosamine, formaldehyde and hydrocyanic acid.)

Ireland 

Ireland currently follows EU standards (see above), but previously ran its own scheme, where one of 8 messages was placed on the pack, as defined in SI 326/1991.

After a High Court settlement in January 2008, it was accepted that the warnings on tobacco products must appear in both official languages of the state. As a result, the European Communities (Manufacture, Presentation 
and Sale of Tobacco Products) (Amendment) Regulations 2008 were put in place. This provides that tobacco products going to market after 30 September 2008 must carry warnings in Irish and English. A year-long transition period applied to products which were on the market prior to 1 October 2008, which may have been sold until 1 October 2009.

Each packet of tobacco products must carry:
One of the following general warnings (in both the Irish and English languages) which must cover at least 32% of the external side.
Toradh caithimh tobac – bás – Smoking kills
Déanann caitheamh tobac díobháil thromchúiseach duit agus do na daoine mórthimpeall ort – Smoking seriously harms you and others around you
AND One of the following additional warnings (in both the Irish and English languages) which must cover at least 45% of the external side.
Giorrú saoil tobac a chaitheamh – Smokers die younger
Nuair a chaitear tobac, tachtar na hartairí agus is é cúis le taomanna croí agus strócanna – Smoking clogs the arteries and causes heart attacks and strokes
Caitheamh tobac is cúis le hailse scamhóg mharfach – Smoking causes fatal lung cancer
Má chaitheann tú tobac le linn toirchis, déantar díobháil don leanbán – Smoking when pregnant harms your baby
Cosain leanaí: ná cuir iallach orthu do chuid deataigh an análú – Protect children: don't make them breathe your smoke
Féadann do dhochtúir nó do chógaiseoir cabhrú leat éirí as caitheamh tobac Your doctor or your pharmacist can help you stop smoking
Is éasca a bheith tugtha do chaitheamh tobac, ná tosaigh leis – Smoking is highly addictive, don't start
Má éiríonn tú as tobac a chaitheamh laghdaítear an riosca de ghalair mharfacha chroí agus scamhóg – Stopping smoking reduces the risk of fatal heart and lung diseases
Féadann caitheamh tobac bheith ina chúis le bás mall pianmhar – Smoking can cause a slow and painful death
Faigh cúnamh chun éirí as caitheamh tobac: Íosghlao Stoplíne 1850 201 203 – Get help to stop smoking: Callsave Quitline 1850 201 203
Féadfaidh caitheamh tobac imshruthúfola a laghdú agus bheith ina chúis le héagumas – Smoking may reduce the blood flow and cause impotence
Caitheamh tobac is cúis le críonadh craicinn – Smoking causes ageing of the skin
Féadann caitheamh tobac dochar a dhéanamh don speirm agus laghdaíonn sé torthúlacht – Smoking can damage the sperm and decreases fertility
Cuimsíonn deatach beinséin, nítreasaimíní, formaildéad agus ciainíd hidrigine – Smoke contains benzene, nitrosamines, formaldehyde and hydrogen cyanide
In the case of Smokeless Tobacco Products, only the following warning must be displayed:
Féadann an táirge tobac seo dochar a dhéanamh do shláinte agus is táirge andúile é – This tobacco product can damage your health and is addictive

Italy 
 
  /  (Smoking kills / Smoking can kill.)
  (Smoking heavily damages you and those around you.)
  (Smokers die younger.)
  (Smoking clogs arteries and causes heart attacks and strokes.)
  (Smoking causes deadly lung cancer.)
  (Smoking during pregnancy harms your baby.)
  (Protect children, don't smoke in their presence.)
  (A doctor or pharmacist can help you quit smoking.)
  (Specialists in the medical sector can help you quit smoking.)
  (Smoking is highly addictive, don't start.)
  (Quitting smoking reduces the risk of deadly cardiovascular and lung diseases.)
  (Smoking can cause a long and painful death.)
  (Smoking causes oral cavities and cancer.)
  (Get help to quit smoking.)
  (Smoking may reduce blood circulation and causes impotence.)
  (Smoking ages the skin.)
  (Smoking may damage sperm and diminishes fertility.)
  (Smoke contains benzene, nitrosamines, formaldehyde and hydrocyanic acid.)
  (Smoking can lead to blindness.)

Other text is sometimes placed in the packets; for example, some packets contain leaflets which have all the above warnings written on them, with more detailed explanations and reasons to give up, and advice from Philip Morris.

Latvia 
 
  (Smoking causes 9 out of 10 lung cancers )
  (Smoking causes mouth and throat cancer)
  (Smoking damages your lungs)
  (Smoking causes heart attacks)
  (Smoking causes strokes and disability)
  (Smoking clogs your arteries )
  (Smoking increases the risk of blindness )
  (Smoking can cause teeth damages and illnesses of gums)
  (Smoking can kill your unborn child )
  (Your smoke harms your children, family and friends )
  (Smokers' children are more likely to start smoking)
  ( Quit smoking now – stay alive for those close to you)
  (Smoking reduces fertility)
  (Smoking increases the risk of impotence)

Lithuania 
General warning:

or

Malta 
  – (DANGER – Health Department – Warning)
  – (Smoking kills)
  – (Smokers die younger)
  – (Smoking clogs the arteries and causes heart attacks and strokes)
  – (Smoking causes fatal lung cancers)
  – (Smoking when pregnant harms your baby)
  – (Protect children: don't make them breathe your smoke)
  – (Your doctor and your pharmacist can help you stop smoking)
  – (Smoking is highly addictive, don't start)
  – (Stopping smoking reduces the risk of fatal heart and lung diseases)
  – (Smoking can cause a slow and painful death)
  – 21231247 – (Get help to stop smoking – 21231247)
  – (Smoking may reduce the blood flow and causes impotence)
  – (Smoking causes aging of the skin)
  – (Smoking can damage the sperm and decrease fertility)
  – (Smokes contains benzene, nitrosamines, formaldehyde and hydrogen cyanide)

Netherlands 

  (Quit smoking, stay alive for your family and friends)
  (Smoking is lethal)
  (Smoking causes impotence)
  (Smoking causes deadly lung cancer)
  (Tobacco smoke contains benzene, nitrosamines, formaldehyde and hydrogencyanide)
  (Your physician or pharmacist can help you to quit smoking)
  (Smokers die younger)
  (Smoking causes clogging of the blood vessels, heart attacks and strokes)
  (Smoking during pregnancy harms your baby)
  (Smoking can kill your unborn child)
  (Protect children: don't let them inhale your smoke)
  (Smoking is very addictive; prevent yourself from starting)
  (Quitting smoking reduces the risk of fatal heart and lung diseases)
  (Smoking may result in a slow, painful death)
  (Smoking may reduce the blood flow and causes impotence)
  (Smoking ages your skin)
  (Smoking can damage the sperm and reduces fertility)
  (Smoking causes serious damage to you and those around you)
  (Your physician or pharmacist can help you to quit smoking, call 0800-555532340 now.)

Poland 

Front of packaging (covers 30% of surface):

or

There are also warnings on the back of every packet:

Palacze tytoniu umierają młodziej (Smokers die younger)
Dzieci palaczy częściej zostają palaczami (Children of smokers become smokers by themselves more often)
Palenie tytoniu zamyka naczynia krwionośne i jest przyczyną zawałów serca i udarów mózgu (Smoking causes clogging of the blood vessels, heart attacks and strokes)
Palenie tytoniu powoduje śmiertelnego raka płuc (Smoking causes fatal lung cancer)
Palenie tytoniu w czasie ciąży szkodzi Twojemu dziecku (Smoking while pregnant harms your baby)
Chrońcie dzieci – nie zmuszajcie ich do wdychania dymu tytoniowego (Protect children: don't let them breath your smoke)
Twój lekarz lub farmaceuta pomoże Ci rzucić palenie (Your doctor or your pharmacist can help you quit smoking)
Palenie tytoniu silnie uzależnia – nie zaczynaj palić (Smoking is highly addictive; do not start smoking)
Zaprzestanie palenia zmniejsza ryzyko groźnych chorób serca i płuc (Stopping smoking reduces the risk of serious heart and lung disease)
Palenie tytoniu może spowodować powolną i bolesną śmierć (Smoking can cause a slow and painful death)
Dzwoniąc pod nr telefonu 0801108108, uzyskasz pomoc w rzuceniu palenia (Get help to quit smoking by calling 0801108108)
Palenie tytoniu może zmniejszyć przepływ krwi i powodować impotencję (Smoking can reduce blood flow and cause impotence)
Palenie tytoniu przyśpiesza starzenie się skóry (Smoking accelerates skin aging)
Palenie tytoniu może uszkodzić nasienie i zmniejszać płodność (Smoking can damage sperm and reduce fertility)
Dym tytoniowy zawiera benzen, nitrozoaminy, formaldehyd i cyjanowodór (Tobacco smoke contains benzene, nitrosamines, formaldehyde and hydrogen cyanide)

Portugal 

  (Smoking kills)
  (Smoking causes deadly lung cancer)
  (Smoking causes serious addiction. Don't start smoking.)
  (Smoking causes skin aging)
  (Smoking seriously harms your health and the health of those around you)
  (If you're pregnant: Smoking harms your child's health)
  (Smokers die prematurely)
  (Smoking clogs your arteries and causes heart attacks and strokes)
  (Smoking might reduce blood flow and causes impotence)
  (Quitting reduces the risks of deadly cardiovascular and pulmonar diseases)

Romania 

General warning (on the front of cigarette packages, covering at least 40% of the area):
 (Smoking kills)
 (Smoking can kill)
 (Smoking seriously harms you and those around);

Additional warnings (on the back of cigarette packages, covering at least 50% of the area):

 (Smokers die younger.)
 (Smoking clogs the arteries and causes heart attacks and strokes)
 (Smoking causes lung cancer, which is lethal.)
 (Smoking when pregnant harms your baby.)
 (Protect children: don't let them breathe your smoke!)
 (Your doctor or pharmacist can help you quit smoking)
 (Smoking is addictive, don't start smoking!)
 (Stopping smoking reduces the risk of fatal heart and lung diseases)
 (Smoking can cause a slow and painful death.)
 (Get help to stop smoking: telephone/postal address/Internet address/consult your doctor/pharmacist...)
 (Smoking reduces blood circulation and causes impotence)
 (Smoking causes skin aging.)
 (Smoking can affect sperm quality and decreases fertility.)
 (Cigarette smoke contains benzene, nitrosamines, formaldehyde and hydrogen cyanide.)

Slovenia 
Front of packaging (covers 30% of surface)

or

Rear of packaging (covers 40% of surface)
  (Smokers die younger.)
  (Smoking clogs arteries and causes heart attacks and strokes.)
  (Smoking causes fatal lung cancer.)
  (Smoking during pregnancy harms your child.)
  (Protect your children from breathing your cigarette smoke.)
  (Your doctor or pharmacist can help you quit smoking.)
  (Smoking is highly addictive, don't start.)
  (Quitting smoking reduces the risk of fatal heart and lung diseases.)
  (Smoking can result in a slow and painful death.)
  (Seek help to quit smoking: consult your doctor.)
  (Smoking can reduce blood circulation and cause impotence.)
  (Smoking causes ageing of the skin.)
  (Smoking damages sperm and reduces fertility.)
 )

Spain 
In Spain, cigarette packages are preceded by warnings on both sides of the package marked "Las Autoridades Sanitarias advierten" (Health authorities warn), written in black and white above the black part of the standard warning.

or

Front of cigarette packages
  (Smoking can kill) (changed in 2010 to "Fumar mata" <Smoking kills>)
  (Smoking seriously harms to your health and that of others)

Back of cigarette packages
  (Smoking shortens life)
  (Smoking causes fatal lung cancer)
  (Tobacco is very addictive, do not start)
  (Smoking clogs the arteries and causes heart disease and stroke)
  (Smoking causes skin aging)
  (Help to stop smoking: consult your doctor or pharmacist)
  (Smoking may reduce blood flow and causes impotence)

Sweden 
General warnings on all Swedish cigarette packagings have been in force since 1977.

Front of cigarette packages
  (Smoking kills.)
  (Tobacco causes serious harm to your health.)
  (Smoking while pregnant may harm your fetus.)
  (Smoking can lead to a slow and painful death.)
  (Smoking can impair the blood flow and causes impotence.)
  (Smoking seriously hurts you and people around you.)
  (Smoke contains benzene, nitrosamines, formaldehyde and hydrogen cyanide.)
  (Protect the children. Don't let them inhale your tobacco smoke.)

Back of cigarette packages
  (Smoking may damage the sperm and reduce fertility.)
  (Smoking is very addictive. Do not start smoking.)

Rear side of snus packaging
  (This tobacco product might cause harm to your health and is addictive.)

Georgia 
General warning:

Ghana 
Ghanaian warnings are compliant with the EU's legislations, as follows:

Packaging 1 (same as in the newer UK packaging):
 Smoking seriously harms you and others around you
 Stopping smoking reduces the risk of fatal heart and lung diseases

Packaging 2 (same as in the older UK packaging):
 Smoking causes cancer
 Smoking damages the health of those around you

Packaging 3 (same as in the older UK packaging):
 Smoking causes fatal diseases 
 Smokers die younger

Honduras 
In Honduras, a variety of warnings with graphic, disturbing images of tobacco-related harms (including a lung cancer and throat cancer) are placed prominently on cigarette packages.

Hong Kong 

Under Hong Kong Law, Chap 371B Smoking (Public Health) (Notices) Order, packaging must indicate the amount of nicotine and tar that is present in cigarette boxes in addition to graphics depicting different health problems caused by smoking in the size and ratio as prescribed by law. The warnings are to be published in both official languages, Traditional Chinese and English.

Every warning begins with the phrase ' HONG KONG SAR GOVERNMENT WARNING' and then one of the following in all caps.
  Smoking Causes Lung Cancer
  Smoking Kills
  Smoking Harms Your Family
  Smoking Causes Peripheral Vascular Diseases
  Smoking May Cause Impotence
  Smoking Can Accelerate Aging of the Skin

In addition, any print advertisement must give minimum 85% coverage of the following warnings:
HKSAR GOVERNMENT HEALTH WARNING
 January - February SMOKING KILLS
 March - April SMOKING CAUSES CANCER
 May - June SMOKING CAUSES HEART DISEASE
 July - August SMOKING CAUSES LUNG CANCER
 September - October SMOKING CAUSES RESPIRATORY DISEASES
 November - December SMOKING HARMS YOUR CHILDREN

Iceland 
All cigarette packets and other tobacco packaging in Iceland must include warnings in the same size and format as in the European Union and using the same approved texts in Icelandic.

General warning:

These warnings are also used:
  (Your doctor or pharmacist can help you quit smoking)
  (Smoking causes cancer)
  (Smoking is very harmful to you and those close to you)
  (Smoking blocks your arteries and causes coronary artery disease and strokes)
  (Smoking causes fatal lung cancer)
  (Smoking during pregnancy harms your child)
  (Protect children – Don't let them inhale tobacco smoke)

India 
Cigarette packets sold in India are required to carry graphical and textual health warnings. The warning must cover at least 85% of the surface of the pack, of which 60% must be pictorial and the remaining 25% contains textual warnings in English, Hindi or any other Indian language.

In 2003, India ratified the World Health Organisation's Framework Convention on Tobacco Control, which includes a recommendation for large, clear health warnings on tobacco packages. However, there was a delay in implementing graphic warning labels.

Until 2008, cigarette packets sold in India were required to carry a written warning on the front of the packet with the text CIGARETTE SMOKING IS INJURIOUS TO HEALTH in English. Paan, gutkha and tobacco packets carried the warning TOBACCO IS INJURIOUS TO HEALTH in Hindi and English. The law later changed. According to the new law, cigarette packets were required to carry pictorial warnings of a skull or scorpion along with the text SMOKING KILLS and TOBACCO CAUSES MOUTH CANCER in both Hindi and English.

The Cigarette and Other Tobacco Products (Packaging and Labelling) Rules 2008 requiring graphic health warnings came into force on 31 May 2008. Under the law, all tobacco products were required to display graphic pictures, such as pictures of diseased lungs, and the text SMOKING KILLS or TOBACCO KILLS in English, covering at least 40% of the front of the pack, and retailers must display the cigarette packs in such a way that the pictures on pack are clearly visible. In January 2012, controversy arose when it was discovered that an image of former English footballer John Terry was used on a warning label.

On 15 October 2014, Union Health Minister Harsh Vardhan announced that only 15% of the surface of a pack of cigarettes could contain branding, and that the rest must be used for graphic and text health warnings. The Union Ministry of Health amended the Cigarettes and Other Tobacco Products (Packaging and Labelling) Rules, 2008 to enforce the changes effective from 1 April 2015.

However, the government decision to increase pictorial warnings on tobacco packets from 1 April was put on hold indefinitely, following the recommendations of a Parliamentary committee, which reportedly did not speak to health experts but only to tobacco lobby representatives. On 5 April 2016, the health ministry ordered government agencies to enforce this new rule.

Following the intervention by the Parliamentary committee, NGO Health of Millions, represented by Prashant Bhushan, filed a petition in the Supreme Court of India, which asked the government to stop selling of loose cigarettes and publish bigger health warnings on tobacco packs.

Indonesia 
In Indonesia, tobacco warnings are not just placed on packages but also on cigarette advertisements, which are not banned in some countries including Indonesia.

Until December 1979

January 1980-December 1992

January 1993–December 2013 
With the enforcement of Indonesian Government Regulation No. 19 (1993), a new warning was implemented:

The last recorded usage of this warning in TV advertisements is in a late February 2014 Esse Mild advertisement.

December 2013–December 2018 

With the enforcement of the Indonesian Government Regulation No. 109 (2012), all tobacco products/cigarette packaging and advertisement should include warning images and age restriction (18+). Graphic warnings must cover 40% of cigarette packages. After the introduction of graphic images in Indonesian cigarette packaging, the branding of cigarettes as "light", "mild", "filter", etc. is forbidden, except for brands that already use some words above such as L.A. Lights, A Mild or Dunhill Filter. However, the last advertisement to use this warning was a 2021 Djarum Super advertisement, before it subsequently used the 2018 warning.

Other alternatives:
 PERINGATAN: MEROKOK SEBABKAN KANKER MULUT (Warning: smoking causes mouth cancer)
 PERINGATAN: MEROKOK SEBABKAN KANKER TENGGOROKAN (Warning: smoking causes throat cancer)
 PERINGATAN: MEROKOK DEKAT ANAK BERBAHAYA BAGI MEREKA (Warning: smoking endangers children near you)
 PERINGATAN: MEROKOK SEBABKAN KANKER PARU-PARU DAN BRONKITIS KRONIS (Warning: smoking causes lung cancer and chronic bronchitis)

The warning below appears on the side of cigarette packaging:
 DILARANG MENJUAL/MEMBERI PADA ANAK USIA DI BAWAH 18 TAHUN DAN PEREMPUAN HAMIL (Do not sell or give [this product] to children under 18 years old and pregnant women)

January 2019– 

After it was revealed that the pictorial warnings used in Indonesia originally came from the 2005 warnings of Thailand, on 31 May 2018, the Ministry of Health launched new pictorial health warnings of which two depict Indonesian smokers and one depicts a smoker from Venezuela.

Other alternatives:
 PERINGATAN: MEROKOK SEBABKAN KANKER MULUT (Warning: smoking causes mouth cancer)
 PERINGATAN: MEROKOK SEBABKAN KANKER PARU (Warning: smoking causes lung cancer)
 PERINGATAN: ROKOK MERENGGUT KEBAHAGIAAN SAYA SATU PERSATU (Warning: one by one, cigarettes took my happiness away)
 PERINGATAN: MEROKOK SEBABKAN KANKER TENGGOROKAN (Warning: smoking causes throat cancer)
 LAYANAN BERHENTI MEROKOK: 0800-177-6565 (Smoking quitline: 0800-177-6565)

Iran 
In Iran, a variety of warnings with graphic, disturbing images of tobacco-related harms (including lung cancer and mouth cancer) are placed prominently on cigarette packages.

Japan 

In 1972, Japan became the first country in Asia to display a general warning on cigarette packages.

Prior to 2005, there was only one warning on all Japanese cigarette packages.
 (For the good of your health, be careful not to smoke too much) (1972–1989)
 (Be careful not to smoke too much, as there is a risk of damaging your health) (1990–2005)

Since 2005, more than one general warning is printed on cigarette packaging.

On the front of cigarette packages:
 (Smoking is a cause of lung cancer. According to epidemiological estimates, smokers are about two to four times more likely than non-smokers to die of lung cancer.)
 (Smoking increases risk of myocardial infarctions. According to epidemiological estimates, smokers are about 1.7 times more likely than non-smokers to die of a heart attack.)
 (Smoking increases risk of strokes. According to epidemiological estimates, smokers are about 1.7 times more likely than non-smokers to die of a stroke.)
 (Smoking can aggravate the symptoms of emphysema.)

On the back of cigarette packages:
 (Smoking during pregnancy is a cause of premature births and impaired fetal growth. According to epidemiological estimates, pregnant women who smoke have almost double the risk of low birth weight and three times the risk of premature births than pregnant women who do not smoke. (For more information, please visit the Ministry of Health home page at www.mhlw.go.jp/topics/tobacco/main.html.))
 (Tobacco smoke adversely affects the health of people around you, especially infants, children and the elderly. When smoking, be careful not to annoy others.)
 (The degree may differ from person to person, but nicotine [in cigarettes] causes addiction to smoking.)
 (Smoking while underage heightens the addiction and damage to health caused by cigarettes. Never smoke, even if encouraged to by those around you.)

Laos 
In Laos, a variety of warnings with graphic, disturbing images of tobacco-related harms (including mouth cancer and rotting teeth) are placed prominently on cigarette packages.

Malaysia 
In Malaysia, general warning as a mandatory on all Malaysian cigarette packaging are in force since June 1976.

 (Warning from the Government of Malaysia: Smoking endangers health)

Starting 1 June 2009, The Malaysian government has decided to place graphic images on the cigarette packs to show the adverse long-term effects of excessive smoking, replacing the general warning with text describing the graphic images printed in Malay (front) and English (back) explaining:

 "Rokok penyebab ..."
 "Cigarette causes ..."

Graphic warning messages must consist 40% of the front of cigarette packages and 60% in the back. After the introduction of graphic images in Malaysian cigarette packaging, the branding of cigarettes as "light", "mild", etc. is forbidden.

Maldives
In Maldives, products containing tobacco are required by law to have (in Dhivehi):

At the front and back of the pack
 A health warning eg. Smoking gives you a painful death
 A cessation message eg. Stop quickly!
 A graphic image (eg. cut open body showing lung cancer)
 Description of the image

On the sides of the pack
 Explanatory message of complications caused by tobacco eg. Tobacco contains 250 poisonous chemicals. These poisons damage vital organs of the body, causing cancer, stroke, lung damage, and other such painful illnesses.
 Get help from a health professional to save yourself!

Mexico 
Since 2010, cigarette packs in Mexico must contain health warnings and graphic images. By law, 30% of the pack's front, 100% of the pack's rear and 100% of one lateral must consist on images and warnings. The Secretariat of Health issues new warnings and images every six months. Images have included a dead rat, a partial mastectomy, a laryngectomy, a dead human fetus surrounded by cigarette butts, a woman being fed after suffering a stroke and damaged lungs, amongst others.

Warnings include smoking-related diseases and statistics, toxins found in cigarettes and others such as:
Smoking kills
Your baby can die (appealing to pregnant women)
You will have a slow and painful death
By smoking, you are hurting your family
Go ahead, shorten your life
Smoking damages your arteries

Mexico became the first country to put a warning on cartons of cigarettes that tobacco use could increase in the risk of COVID-19 infection.

Moldova 
General warning (on the front of cigarette packages, covering at least 30% of the area, Helvetica font):

"Fumatul ucide" (Smoking kills) or
"Fumatul dăunează grav sănătăţii dumneavoastră şi a celor din jur" (Smoking seriously harms you and those around);

Additional warnings (on the back of cigarette packages, covering at least 40% of the area, Helvetica font):

"Fumătorii mor mai tineri" (smokers die younger);
"Fumatul blochează arterele şi provoacă infarct miocardic şi accident vascular cerebral" (Smoking clogs the arteries and causes heart attacks and strokes);
"Fumatul conduce la moarte de cancer pulmonar" (smoking causes death from lung cancer);
"Fumatul în timpul sarcinii dăunează copilului dumneavoastră" (Smoking while pregnant harm your baby);
"Protejaţi copiii dumneavoastră de inspirarea fumului de ţigaretă" (Protect your children from breathing in the cigarette smoke);
"Psihologul, profesorul sau medicul vă poate ajuta să renunţaţi la fumat" (Psychologists, professors and doctors can help you quit smoking);
"Fumatul creează dependenţă rapidă, nu încercaţi să fumaţi" (Smoking becomes addictive fast, try not to smoke);
"Abandonarea fumatului reduce riscul de îmbolnăviri cardiace sau pulmonare fatale" (Quitting smoking reduces the risk of fatal heart and lung diseases);
"Fumatul poate provoca o moarte lentă şi dureroasă" (Smoking can cause a slow and painful death);
"Fumatul reduce circulaţia sîngelui şi provoacă impotenţă" (Smoking reduces blood circulation and increases impotency);
"Fumatul provoacă îmbolnăvirea tenului (pielei)" (Smoking causes skin diseases);
"Fumatul creează grave disfuncţii sexuale" (Smoking causes serious sexual dysfunction);

Regulated by "Lege cu privire la tutun şi la articolele din tutun" (Law on tobacco and tobacco articles) nr. 278-XVI from 14.12.2007 enabled at 07.03.2008

There is no such rule in Transnistria, where cigarette packages have variable warning labels, depending on where they come from.

Mongolia 
In Mongolia, a variety of warnings with graphic, disturbing images of tobacco-related harms (including heart diseases and lung cancer) are placed prominently on cigarette packages.

Montenegro 
In Montenegro, a variety of warnings with graphic, disturbing images of tobacco-related harms (including mouth cancer and lung cancer) are placed prominently on cigarette packages.

Myanmar 
In Myanmar, a variety of warnings with graphic, disturbing images of tobacco-related harms (including a heart attack and mouth cancer) are placed prominently on cigarette packages.

Nepal 
In Nepal, a variety of warnings with graphic, disturbing images of tobacco-related harms (including lung cancer and mouth cancer) are placed prominently on cigarette packages.

New Zealand 
The first health warnings appeared on cigarette packets in New Zealand in 1974. Warning images accompanying text have been required to appear on each packet since 28 February 2008. New regulations were made on 14 March 2018 which provided for larger warnings and a new schedule of images and messages.

By law, 75% of a pack's front and 100% of its rear must consist of warning messages. Images include gangrenous toes, rotting teeth and gums, diseased lungs and smoking-damaged hearts. Cigarette packets also carry the New Zealand Quitline logo and phone number and other information about quitting smoking.

In total, there are 15 different warnings. A full list with pictures is available at the New Zealand Ministry of Health's website. Warning messages are rotated annually. The following is a list of the warnings in English and Māori.

Smoking causes heart attacks, KA PĀ MAI NGĀ MANAWA-HĒ I TE KAI PAIPA

Smoking causes over 80% of lung cancers, NEKE ATU I TE 80% O NGĀ MATE PUKUPUKU KI NGĀ PŪKAHUKAHU I AHU MAI I TE KAI PAIPA

Smoking harms your baby before it is born, KA TŪKINOHIA TŌ PĒPI I TO KŌPŪ I TE KAI PAIPA

Your smoking harms others, KA TŪKINOHIA ĒTAHI ATU I Ō MAHI KAI PAIPA

Smoking is a major cause of stroke, KA PIKI AKE I TE KAI PAIPA TŌ TŪPONO KI TE IKURA RORO

Smoking damages your blood vessels, KA TŪKINOHIA Ō IA TOTO I TE KAI PAIPA

Smoking is not attractive, KA ANUANU KOE I TE KAI PAIPA

Smoking causes lung cancer, KA PĀ MAI TE MATE PUKUPUKU KI NGĀ PŪKAHUKAHU I TE KAI PAIPA

Smoking when pregnant harms your baby, KA TŪKINOHIA TŌ PĒPI I TE KAI PAIPA I A KOE E HAPŪ ANA

Your smoking harms children, KA TŪKINOHIA NGĀ TAMARIKI I Ō MAHI KAI PAIPA

Quit before it is too late, ME WHAKAMUTU KEI RIRO KOE

Smoking causes gum disease and stinking breath, KA PĀ TE MATE PŪNIHO, KA HAUNGA TŌ HĀ I TE KAI PAIPA

Nigeria 
There are six warnings that exist prior to 2013:
 Smoking is addictive
 Smoking damages lungs
 Smoking can kill
 Smoking can cause cancer
 Smoking can damage the fetus

From 2013 onward, the general warning is:

North Korea 
North Korea signed the WHO Framework Convention on Tobacco Control on 17 June 2003 and ratified it on 27 April 2005. Tobacco packaging warning messages are required on all types of packaging, but their appearance is not regulated in any way. They are usually printed in small print on the side of the package and only state that smoking is harmful to health. However, the descriptions must state the nicotine and tar content, must not be misleading and do need to be approved by local authorities. Graphic warning images that are now common worldwide have never appeared on packaging in North Korea.

Norway 

Norway has had general warnings on cigarette packets since 1975. Norway's warnings of today were introduced in 2003 and are in line with the European Union's legislation, as Norway is an EEA member:

On the front of cigarette and cigar packages, covering about 30% of the area:
 (Smoking kills)
 (Smoking is very harmful to you and your surroundings)

On the back of cigarette and cigar packages, covering about 45% of the area:
 (Smoking causes fatal lung cancer)
 (If you stop smoking, you will reduce the risk of fatal heart and lung diseases)
 (Smoking causes early ageing of the skin)
 (Smoking may reduce the blood flow and cause impotence)
 (Smoking can cause a slow and painful death)
 (Smoking can reduce sperm quality and decrease fertility)
 (Protect children against smoke, don't let them inhale your smoke)
 (Smoking is highly addictive: Don't start smoking)
 (Smoking clogs the arteries and causes heart attacks and strokes)
 (Your doctor or your pharmacy can help you stop smoking)
 (Get help to stop smoking – call the Quitline: 800 400 85)
 (Smoking lowers life expectancy)
 (Smoking during pregnancy harms the child)
 (Smoke contains benzene, nitrosamines, formaldehyde and hydrogen cyanide)

Tobacco products like snus and chewing tobacco have the following warning printed on them:
 (This tobacco product may be a health hazard and is addictive)

Pakistan 
All cigarettes are required by Statutory Order 1219(I)/2008 dated 25 September 2008, published in the Gazette of Pakistan dated 24 November 2008, to carry rotating health warnings from 1 July 2009.

Each health warning is printed for a period of 6 months, covering at least 30% on both sides of the packet and must be printed in Urdu at the front and English at the back. The warnings in English currently in use are:

 Protect children, do not let them breathe your smoke – Ministry of Health
 Smoking causes mouth and throat cancer – Ministry of Health
 Quit smoking and live a longer life – Ministry of Health
 Smoking severely harms you and the people around you – Ministry of Health

Panama 
In Panama, a variety of warnings with graphic, disturbing images of tobacco-related harms (including throat cancer and lung cancer) are placed prominently on cigarette packages.

Paraguay 
In Paraguay, a variety of warnings with graphic, disturbing images of tobacco-related harms (including impotence and heart attack) are placed prominently on cigarette packages.

Peru 
In Peru, a variety of warnings with graphic, disturbing images of tobacco-related harms (including abortions and asthma) are placed prominently on cigarette packages.

Philippines 

All cigarette packaging sold in the Philippines are required to display a government warning label. The warnings include:

 Government Warning: Cigarette smoking is dangerous to your health.
 Government Warning: Cigarettes are addictive.
 Government Warning: Tobacco smoke can harm your children.
 Government Warning: Smoking kills.

In July 2014, President Benigno Aquino III signed the Republic Act 10643, or "An Act to Effectively Instill Health Consciousness through Graphic Health Warnings on Tobacco Products", more known as the "Graphic Health Warning Act." This law requires tobacco product packaging to display pictures of the ill effects of smoking, occupying the bottom half of the display area in both front and the back side of the packaging. On 3 March 2016, Department of Health (DOH) secretary Janette Garin started the implementation of Republic Act 10643, requiring tobacco manufacturers to include graphic health warnings on newer cigarette packaging.

With the Graphic Health Warning Act implemented, graphic health warnings are used on all newer cigarette packages and older packages using text-only warnings are required to be replaced by newer ones incorporating graphic warnings. The 12 new warnings, showing photos of negative effects of smoking, like mouth cancer, impotence and gangrene are rotated every month, and on 3 November 2016, all cigarette packaging without graphic health warning messages are banned from sale. Labeling of cigarettes with "light" or "mild" is also forbidden by the Graphic Health Warning Act.

Russia 

Warning messages on Russian cigarette packets were revised in 2013, falling in line with European Union standards.

12 different variants are used.

Serbia 

The warning messages on Serbian cigarette packets are visually similar to what is used in European Union countries, but the texts used in Serbia are not translated from EU-approved texts.

Singapore 
Singapore used blunt, straight-to-the-point messages such as "Smoking causes lung cancer" as text warnings on cigarette packets. They were later replaced by graphic warnings in August 2004, with gory pictures and the following messages:
Smoking causes a slow painful death
Smoking harms your family
Tobacco smoke can kill babies
Smoking causes stroke
Smoking causes lung cancer
Smoking causes mouth diseases

In 2016, the images and warnings were revised, with images focusing mostly on damaged organs. The following warnings show what is printed nowadays.
Smoking causes mouth diseases
Smoking can cause a slow and painful death
Smoking causes lung cancer
Smoking causes gangrene
Smoking causes neck cancer
Smoking harms your family
Smoking causes 92% of oral cancer

From 1 January 2009, people possessing cigarettes without the SDPC (Singapore Duty Paid Cigarettes) label will be committing an offence under the Customs and GST Acts. The law was passed to distinguish non-duty paid, contraband cigarettes from duty-paid ones.

Switzerland 
Switzerland has four official languages, but only has warning messages in three languages. The fourth language, Romansh, is only spoken by 0.5% of the population and those persons typically also speak either German or Italian. The three warning messages below, all meaning "Smoking kills", are posted on cigarette packs, cartons and advertisements such as outdoor billboards and posters:
 Fumer tue.
 Rauchen tötet.
 Il fumo uccide.

Somalia 
A small warning, in Somali and English, is printed on Somali cigarette packages.

South Africa 
In South Africa, the Tobacco Products Control Act, 1993 and its amendments (1999, 2007, 2009), stipulate that a warning related to the harmful effects (health, social, or economic) of tobacco smoking, or the beneficial effects of cessation, must be placed prominently on tobacco products covering 15% of the obverse, 25% of the reverse and 20% of the sides of packs.

According to the draft Control of Tobacco Products and Electronic Delivery Systems Bill, 2018, new legislation, once enacted, will require uniform, plain-colored packaging (branding and logos prohibited) containing the brand and product name in a standard typeface and color, a warning related to the harmful effects of tobacco smoking, or beneficial effects of cessation, and a graphic image of tobacco-related harm.

South Korea 
In South Korea, general warnings on cigarette packaging have been used since 1976. The warning messages used since then have been
 From 1976 to 1989:  (For your health, please refrain from smoking too much)
 From December 1989 to 1996:  (Smoking may cause lung cancer and it is especially dangerous for teenagers and pregnant women)
 From 1996 to March 2005:

Front:  (Smoking causes lung cancer and other diseases and it is especially dangerous for teenagers and pregnant women)

Back:  (It is illegal to sell cigarettes to people under 19) and additionally,  (You can be healthy and live longer if you quit),  (Smoking also causes paralysis and heart diseases),  (Smoking also damages your beloved children),  (Smoking damages others)

 From April 2005 to April 2007:

Front: 건강을 해치는 담배 그래도 피우시겠습니까? (Smoking damages your health. Do you still want to smoke?)

Back 19세 미만 청소년에게 판매할 수 없습니다 (It is illegal to sell cigarettes to people under 19) and additionally, 금연하면 건강해지고 장수할 수 있습니다 (You can be healthy and live longer if you quit), 흡연은 중풍과 심장병도 일으킵니다 (Smoking also causes paralysis and heart diseases), 흡연은 사랑하는 자녀의 건강도 해칩니다 (Smoking also damages your beloved children), 당신이 흡연하면 다른 사람의 건강도 해칩니다 (Smoking damages others)
 From April 2007 to April 2009 Front 흡연은 폐암 등 각종 질병의 원인이 되며, 특히 임신부와 청소년의 건강에 해롭습니다 (Smoking causes lung cancer and other diseases and it is especially dangerous for teenagers and pregnant women)

Back 19세 미만 청소년에게 판매 금지! 당신 자녀의 건강을 해칩니다" (It is illegal to sell cigarettes to people under 19! It hurts your children's health)

 From April 2009 to April 2011 (a prospectus)

Front:  (Smoking damages your health. Once you start smoking, it is very difficult to quit)

Back:  (It is illegal to sell cigarettes to people under 19! It hurts your children's health)

 From December 2016, 50% of cigarette packages must contain warning elements, of which 30% must be graphic warnings. In addition to the existing warning:  (Smoking can be a cause of disease), the following warning will be mandatory:  (Smoking can harm another person's health)
 From 2017, more pictorial warnings were added to cigarette packs.

Sri Lanka 
In Sri Lanka, a variety of warnings with graphic, disturbing images of tobacco-related harms (including cancer and heart attack) are placed prominently on cigarette packages.

Taiwan 
The warnings in Taiwan are led by the phrase "行政院衛生署警告" (Warning from the Department of Health, Executive Yuan:) and followed by one of the following warnings:
 吸菸有害健康: Smoking is hazardous to your health
 孕婦吸菸易導致胎兒早產及體重不足: Smoking during pregnancy can cause premature death and underweight birth
 抽菸會導致肺癌﹑心臟病﹑氣腫及與懷孕有關的問題: Smoking can cause lung cancer, heart diseases, emphysema and pregnancy-related problems
 吸菸害人害己: Smoking hurts yourself and others
 懷孕婦女吸菸可能傷害胎兒，導致早產及體重不足: Smoking during pregnancy might damage the fetus and can cause premature death and underweight birth
 戒菸可減少健康的危害: Quitting smoking can reduce health risks (no longer used)

The images and warnings were revised in 2014, after the Department of Health was reorganised into the Ministry of Health and Welfare. The following warnings show what is printed since 1 June 2014.

 吸菸導致皮膚老化: Smoking causes ageing of the skin
 菸癮困你一生: Tobacco addiction traps your life
 吸菸會導致性功能障礙: Smoking causes sexual dysfunctions
 菸害導致胎兒異常及早產: Smoking causes birth defects and premature birth
 不吸菸，你可以擁有更多: You can have more if you quit smoking
 二手菸引發兒童肺炎、中耳炎、癌症: Second hand smoking causes pneumonia, otitis media and cancer in children 
 吸菸影響口腔衛生: Smoking affects oral hygiene
 吸菸引發自己與家人中風與心臟病: Smoking makes you and your family suffer strokes and heart diseases

Warnings of any version are accompanied with "戒煙專線: 0800-636363" (Smoking Quitline: 0800–636363).

Thailand 
In Thailand, a variety of warnings with graphic, disturbing images of tobacco-related harms (including a tracheotomy and rotting teeth) are placed prominently on cigarette packages. A recent study showed that the warnings made Thai smokers think more often about the health risks of smoking and about quitting smoking.

Thailand introduced plain packaging in 2020.

Turkey 

Front of packaging (covers 65% of surface)

or

Back of packaging (covers 40% of surface)
  (Smokers die younger)
  (Smoking clogs the arteries and causes heart attacks and paralysis.)
  (Smoking causes lethal lung cancer)
  (Smoking while pregnant will harm the baby)
  (Protect your children, don't let them breathe your smoke.)
  (Health agencies can help you quit smoking)
  (Smoking is highly addictive, don't start)
  (Stopping smoking reduces the risk of fatal heart and lung diseases)
  (Smoking can cause a slow and painful death)
  (To quit smoking ask for help from your doctor and ...)
  (Smoking will slow the blood flow and cause impotence)
  (Smoking causes early ageing of the skin)
  (Smoking can damage the sperm and decreases fertility)
  (Cigarette smoke contains carcinogens such as benzene, nitrosamines, formaldehyde and hydrogen cyanide.)

Ukraine 
The warning messages on Ukrainian cigarette packets are also visually similar to those in European Union countries:

United Kingdom 

In 1971, tobacco companies printed on the left side of cigarette packets an official warning: "WARNING by H.M. Government – SMOKING CAN DAMAGE YOUR HEALTH", followed by the phrase "Health Department's Chief Medical Officers", issuers of the warning.

In 1991, the EU tightened laws on tobacco warnings. "TOBACCO SERIOUSLY DAMAGES HEALTH" was printed on the front of all tobacco packs. An additional warning was also printed on the reverse of cigarette packs.

In 2003, new EU regulations required one of the following general warnings must be displayed, covering at least 30% of the surface of the pack:
 Smoking kills - quit now
 Smoking seriously harms you and others around you

Additionally, one of the following additional warnings must be displayed, covering at least 40% of the surface of the pack:
 Smokers die younger
 Smoking clogs the arteries and causes heart attacks and strokes
 Smoking causes fatal lung cancer
 Smoking when pregnant harms your baby
 Protect children: don't make them breathe your smoke
 Your doctor or your pharmacist can help you stop smoking
 Smoking is highly addictive, don't start
 Stopping smoking reduces the risk of fatal heart and lung diseases
 Smoking can cause a slow and painful death
 Get help to stop smoking: [telephone]/[postal address]/[internet address]/consult your doctor/pharmacist
 Smoking may reduce the blood flow and cause impotence
 Smoking causes ageing of the skin
 Smoking can damage the sperm and decreases fertility
 Smoke contains benzene, nitrosamines, formaldehyde and hydrogen cyanide

From October 2008, all cigarette products manufactured must carry picture warnings in the reverse. Every pack must have one of these warnings by October 2009.

Plain packaging, including prominent and standardised health warnings and minimal manufacturer information, became compulsory for all cigarette and hand-rolling tobacco packs manufactured after May 2016 and sold after May 2017.

United States

In 1966, the United States became the first nation in the world to require a health warning on cigarette packages.

In 1973, the assistant director of Research at R.J. Reynolds Tobacco Company wrote an internal memorandum regarding new brands of cigarettes for the youth market. He observed that, "psychologically, at eighteen, one is immortal" and theorized that "the desire to be daring is part of the motivation to start smoking." He stated, "in this sense the label on the package is a plus."

In 1999, Philip Morris USA purchased three brands of cigarettes from Liggett Group Inc. The brands were: Chesterfield, L&M, and Lark.   At the time Philip Morris purchased the brands from Liggett, the packaging for those cigarettes included the statement "Smoking is Addictive".  After Philip Morris acquired the three Liggett brands, it removed the statement from the packages.

Though the United States started the trend of labeling cigarette packages with warnings, today the country has one of the least restrictive labelling requirements on their packages. Warnings are usually in small typeface placed along one of the sides of the cigarette packs with colors and fonts that closely resemble the rest of the package, so the warnings essentially are integrated and do not stand out with the rest of the cigarette package.

However, this is subject to change as the Family Smoking Prevention and Tobacco Control Act of 2009 requires color graphics with supplemental text that depicts the negative consequences of smoking to cover 50 percent of the front and rear of each pack. The nine new graphic warning labels were announced by the FDA in June 2011 and were required to appear on packaging by September 2012, though this was delayed by legal challenges.

In August 2011, five tobacco companies filed a lawsuit against the FDA in an effort to reverse the new warning mandate. Tobacco companies claimed that being required to promote government anti-smoking campaigns by placing the new warnings on packaging violates the companies' free speech rights. Additionally, R.J. Reynolds, Lorillard, Commonwealth Brands Inc., Liggett Group LLC and Santa Fe Natural Tobacco Company Inc. claimed that the graphic labels are an unconstitutional way of forcing tobacco companies to engage in anti-smoking advocacy on the government's behalf. A First Amendment lawyer, Floyd Abrams, represented the tobacco companies in the case, contending that requiring graphic warning labels on a lawful product cannot withstand constitutional scrutiny. The Association of National Advertisers and the American Advertising Federation also filed a brief in the suit, arguing that the labels infringe on commercial free speech and could lead to further government intrusion if left unchallenged.

On 29 February 2012, US District Judge Richard Leon ruled that the labels violate the right to free speech in the First Amendment. However, the following month the US Court of Appeals for the 6th Circuit upheld the majority of the Tobacco Control Act of 2009, including the part requiring graphic warning labels. In April 2013 the Supreme Court declined to hear the appeal to this ruling, allowing the new labels to stand. As the original ruling against the FDA images was not actually reversed, the FDA will again need to go through the process of developing the new warning labels, and the timetable and final product remain unknown.  Also, rulings of the 6th Circuit are precedential only in the states comprising the 6th Circuit, i.e., Michigan, Ohio, Kentucky, and Tennessee.

In March 2020, the FDA approved a set of 11 new graphic warning labels with images for cigaratte packaging, with a deadline of compliance being set to 
June 18, 2021. The mandate would have required packaging to cover the top 50% of the front and rear panels of packages, as well as at least 20% of the top. Tobacco manufacturers R.J. Reynolds Tobacco Co., Philip Morris USA, ITG Brands LLC and Liggett Group LLC filed a joint motion requesting a preliminary injunction on implementing the labels and a ruling to prohibit enforcement in April 2020. They argued that the new packaging would have been a violation of the First Amendment. In December 2022, U.S. district judge J. Campbell Barker of the Eastern District of Texas ordered the new guidelines to be vacated, arguing the multiple interpretation of images cannot prove neutrality. The deadline was pushed to November 6, 2023.

Cigars 
 SURGEON GENERAL WARNING: Cigar Smoking Can Cause Cancers of the Mouth And Throat, Even If You Do Not Inhale.
 SURGEON GENERAL WARNING: Cigars Are Not A Safe Alternative To Cigarettes.
 SURGEON GENERAL WARNING: Tobacco Smoke Increases The Risk of Lung Cancer And Heart Disease, Even in Nonsmokers.
 SURGEON GENERAL WARNING: Cigar Smoking Can Cause Lung Cancer And Heart Disease.
 SURGEON GENERAL WARNING: Tobacco Use Increases The Risk of Infertility, Stillbirth, And Low Birth Weight.
 SURGEON GENERAL WARNING: This Product Contains/Produces Chemicals Known to the State of California To Cause Cancer, And Birth Defects Or Other Reproductive Harm.

Stronger warning labels started to appear in May 2010.

Smokeless tobacco 

Effective June 2010, the following labels began to appear on smokeless tobacco products (also known as chewing tobacco) and their advertisements.
 WARNING: This product can cause mouth cancer.
 WARNING: This product can cause gum disease and tooth loss.
 WARNING: This product is not a safe alternative to cigarettes.
 WARNING: Smokeless tobacco is addictive.

The new warnings are required to comprise 30 percent of two principal display panels on the packaging; on advertisements, the health warnings must constitute 20 percent of the total area.

Uruguay 
In Uruguay, a variety of warnings with graphic, disturbing images of tobacco-related harms (including lung cancer and mouth cancer) are placed prominently on cigarette packages.

Venezuela 
Since 1978 in Venezuela, the only warning in cigarette packs was printed in a very small typeface along one of the sides:

"" (It has been determined that cigarette smoking is harmful to your health – Cigarette Tax Law)

On 24 March 2005, another warning was introduced in every cigarette pack, similar to what was implemented in Brazil: "Este producto contiene alquitrán, nicotina y monóxido de carbono, los cuales son cancerígenos y tóxicos. No existen niveles seguros para el consumo de estas sustancias" ("This product contains tar, nicotine and carbon monoxide, which are carcinogenic and toxic. There are no safe levels for consumption of these substances").

The 1978 warning was not removed, so now every cigarette pack contains both warnings (one on each side).

In addition, since 24 March 2005, as part of the "Venezuela 100% libre de humo" (100% smoke-free Venezuela) campaign, one of the following warnings is randomly printed very prominently, along with a graphical image, occupying 100% of the back of the pack (40% for the text warning and 60% for the image):

  (This product is hazardous to your health and is addictive)
  (Smoking causes bad breath, tooth decay and mouth cancer)
  (Smoking causes lung cancer, coughing, pulmonar emphysema and chronic bronchitis). The picture accompanying this warning is a comparison between a smoker's lung on the left and a healthy lung on the right.
  (Smoking causes cardiac infarction. R.I.P. bearer, killed by smoking)
  (Smoking while pregnant harms your baby)
  (Children start smoking when they see adults smoke)
  (Smoking cigarettes causes laryngeal cancer)
  (Smoking causes impotence in men)
  (Cigarette smoke also harms those who don't smoke)
  (Take your first step today, quitting is possible)

Curiously, these warnings only appear on cigarette packs and not on other tobacco products (which only use the 1978 warning).

Vietnam 
The following warnings appear on Vietnamese cigarette packages since 2013, along with graphic, disturbing images of tobacco-related harms:
  (Smoking leads to a slow and painful death)
  (Smoke is harmful to infants and young children)
  (Smoking causes heart diseases)
  (Smoking causes throat and laryngeal cancer)
  (Smoking causes halitosis and damages teeth)
  (Smoking causes lung cancer)

References

External links 

 Tobacco Labelling Resource Centre
 Warning: Graphic Cigarette Labels — slideshow by Life magazine
 BBC News Online: "Spoof cigarette warnings slammed"
 Directive 2001/37/EC of the European Parliament and of the Council of 5 June 2001
 UCSF Tobacco Industry Videos Collection
 Quit Now, website advertised on Australian packets of cigarettes
 Cigarette Package Health Warnings International Status Report – Fourth Edition

Tobacco control
Cigarette packaging
Safety
Warning systems
Health effects of tobacco